The Antigua and Barbuda Sailing Association is recognised by World Sailing as the governing body for the sport of sailing in Antigua and Barbuda. The current president of the association is Karl James, who succeeded founder and president of over thirty years Geoffrey Pidduck.

References

National members of World Sailing
Yachting associations
Sailing associations
Sailing in Antigua and Barbuda
Sports governing bodies in Antigua and Barbuda